"Everything I've Known" is a song written and recorded by American nu metal band Korn for their sixth studio album, Take a Look in the Mirror. It was released as the album's fourth and final single in April 2004.

Concept

The meaning of the song was further explained as somewhat of an emotional reaction to what is believed to be the decline of the music industry.

Charts

Music video
No official video was filmed for the song, although an animated video by Gregory Ecklund received moderate airplay on MTV2's Headbangers Ball.

References

Korn songs
2003 songs
2004 singles
Epic Records singles
Songs written by Reginald Arvizu
Songs written by Jonathan Davis
Songs written by James Shaffer
Songs written by David Silveria
Songs written by Brian Welch